Bygdebladet (The Country Gazette) is a newspaper published in Sjøholt in Møre og Romsdal county, Norway. The newspaper is published in Nynorsk and is issued on Wednesdays and Saturdays in the municipalities of Vestnes, Ørskog, Stordal, Skodje, and Haram. The paper was started in 1972 by Kjell Opsal. Opsal edited the paper until 2015, when he was succeeded by Reidar Opsal.

Circulation
According to the Norwegian Audit Bureau of Circulations (Norsk Opplagskontroll) and the National Association of Local Newspapers (Landslaget for lokalaviser), Bygdebladet has had the following annual circulation:
2006: 3,056
2007: 2,979
2008: 2,847
2009: 2,870
2010: 2,801
2011: 2,691
2012: 2,642
2013: 2,500
2014: 2,439
2015: 2,474
2016: 2,474

References

External links
Bygdebladet home page

Newspapers published in Norway
Norwegian-language newspapers
Mass media in Møre og Romsdal
Newspapers established in 1972
1972 establishments in Norway